USS Enterprise (NCC-1701) is a starship in the Star Trek media franchise. It is the main setting of the original Star Trek television series (1966–69), and it is depicted in films, other television series, spin-off fiction, products, and fan-created media. Under the command of Captain James T. Kirk, the Enterprise carries its crew on a mission "to explore strange, new worlds; to seek out new life and new civilizations; to boldly go where no man has gone before." The 2022 series Star Trek: Strange New Worlds depicts the Enterprise under the command of Kirk's predecessor, Captain Christopher Pike.

Matt Jefferies designed the Enterprise for television, and its core components – a saucer-shaped primary hull, two offset engine nacelles, and a cylindrical secondary hull – persisted across several television and film redesigns. After the Enterprise's destruction in the third franchise film, the production model was refurbished and depicted as its successor starship, the USS Enterprise, NCC-1701-A.

Initially a vision of the potential for human spaceflight, the Enterprise became a popular culture icon. The vessel influenced the design of subsequent franchise spacecraft, and the model filmed for the original Star Trek TV series has been on display for decades at the National Air and Space Museum. The Enterprise has repeatedly been identified as one of the best-designed and most influential science fiction spacecraft.

Development and production

Concept and initial design 
Pato Guzman was the original art director assigned to Star Trek; Matt Jefferies, his assistant, took over when Guzman left the project. Jefferies, who was not a science fiction fan, was the Enterprise's primary designer and he based his work on concepts from series creator Gene Roddenberry. Roddenberry did not have any ideas about what the ship should look like, but he laid out several parameters:

Roddenberry further specified that the Enterprise would have a crew of 100–150 and be incredibly fast. Jefferies and Roddenberry did not want the Enterprise to look like any of the rocket ships already used by the aerospace industry or in popular culture; many designs were rejected for being "too conventional". To meet Roddenberry's requirement that the ship look believable, Jefferies tried "to visualize what the fourth, fifth or tenth generation of present-day equipment would be like". Jefferies' experience with aviation let him imbue his designs with what he called "aircraft logic". He imagined the ship's engines would be too powerful to be near the crew, requiring them to be set apart from the hull. While Jefferies initially rejected a disk-shaped component, worried about the similarities to flying saucers, a spherical module eventually flattened into a disk.

During a visit to Jefferies, Roddenberry and NBC staff were drawn to a sketch of the Enterprise resembling its final configuration. Jefferies had created a small model of this design that, when held from a string, hung upside-down – an appearance he had to "unsell". He kept the hull smooth, with a sense that the ship's components were serviced from inside. He designed the Klingon starship seen in the third season by rearranging and changing the shape of the Enterprises basic modules: a main body, two engine pods, and a neck with a head on it. Some of Jefferies' rejected design concepts – such as spherical hull sections and warp engines that encircle a ship – inspired future Star Trek vessel designs.

The Enterprise was originally going to be named Yorktown, but Roddenberry was fascinated by the aircraft carrier Enterprise and had "always been proud of that ship and wanted to use the name." The NCC-1701 registry stems from NC being one of the international aircraft registration codes assigned to the United States. The second C was added because Soviet aircraft used Cs, and Jefferies believed a venture into space would be a joint operation by the United States and Russia. Jefferies rejected 3, 6, 8, and 9 as "too easily confused" on screen; he eventually reasoned the Enterprise was the first vessel of Starfleet's 17th starship design, hence 1701. The Making of Star Trek explains that USS means "United Space Ship" and that "Enterprise is a member of the Starship Class". Licensed texts, on-screen graphics, and dialogue later describe the ship as a Constitution-class vessel.

Filming models 

The first miniature built from Jefferies' drawings was a  scale model. Desilu Studios, which produced Star Trek, hired Richard C. Datin to make a pre-production model. Datin used a subcontractor with a large lathe for major subcomponents and otherwise worked on the model for about 110 hours in November 1964. The  model was made mostly of pine, with Plexiglass and brass details. Datin made minor changes after Roddenberry's review, and he submitted the completed model – which cost about $600 – to Desilu in December 1964.

Desilu then ordered a larger filming model, which Datin contracted to Volmer Jensen and Production Model Shop in Burbank. Datin supervised the work and did detailing on the model, which was constructed from plaster, sheet metal, and wood. The model was delivered too late to be used much for the initial pilot, "The Cage". When Roddenberry was approved to film the second pilot, "Where No Man Has Gone Before" (1966), various details of the 11-foot model were altered, and the starboard windows and running lights were internally illuminated. When the series went into production, the model was altered yet again, and it was regularly modified throughout its active filming. Most of the fine details on the large model were not visible to television viewers. Wiring for the interior lighting ran into the model on its left side, so the model could only be filmed from the right; for shots requiring the other side of the Enterprise, the footage was either flipped or filmed using the 33-inch model. Because of this, some of the fine details added to the model were added only to its left side.

The 11-foot model was initially filmed by Howard Anderson. Anderson's team struggled to film the model in a way that suggested it was moving at tremendous speeds, as the producers wanted to avoid the cliched look of a spacecraft drifting through space. Anderson could not keep up with the filming and special effects needs for regular production, so producers hired several other studios to contribute effects and additional footage. Motion control equipment was too expensive, so the ship was filmed with stop motion. Filming was often delayed by the heat generated by the studio and model's lights. Special effects were produced as cheaply as possible. Most third-season footage of the Enterprise was reused first- or second-season footage. Animators for Star Trek: The Animated Series (1973–75) rotoscoped Enterprise footage to recreate the ship's movements, contributing to the impression of the animated series being a fourth season of the original. The animated show's limited color palette could not accommodate all of the ship's various colors, so the Enterprise was depicted as a consistent gray.

For the Star Trek: Deep Space Nine episode "Trials and Tribble-ations" (1996), Greg Jein created an Enterprise model exactly half the size of the 11-foot original, and it was the first production model of the starship to be built in more than 30 years. A CGI Enterprise makes a cameo appearance at the end of the Star Trek: Enterprise series finale, "These Are the Voyages..." (2005). Artists creating another CGI Enterprise for the remastered original series had to ensure the model was not so detailed that it was incongruous with the overall 1960s production.

Sets, sounds, and fixtures 

The Enterprise was meant to serve as a familiar, recurring setting, similar to Dodge City in Gunsmoke and Blair General Hospital in Dr. Kildare. Reusing sets also helped address Desilu's budget concerns. As production continued, standing sets like the engine room and bridge became increasingly detailed. The bridge was monochromatic for "The Cage", but it was redecorated for "Where No Man Has Gone Before" because of the increasing popularity of color televisions. Roddenberry described the ship's hallways as "Des Moines Holiday Inn Style". To keep the ship from looking too sterile, Roddenberry hired Mike Minor to create several paintings that were hung in Kirk's quarters, the recreation area, and the upper rim of the bridge. The ship's chairs were manufactured by Burke of Dallas and similar to the original tulip chair designed by Eero Saarinen. At Roddenberry's direction, sound effects designer Doug Grindstaff created sounds for different parts of the vessel: console sound effects were often created with a Hammond electric organ or other musical instrument, and engine sounds were created in part with a noisy air conditioner. The production staff used the term "Jefferies tube" as an inside joke referencing Matt Jefferies to describe the ship's maintenance tunnels, and the term is used in dialogue to describe similar crawl spaces in spinoffs. Although the interior in The Animated Series was largely recreated from the live action series, a second turbolift was added to the bridge in response to Roddenberry being asked, "What do they do if the [one turbolift's] doors get stuck?" Franz Joseph designed full Enterprise interior deck plans in 1974 with approval from Roddenberry.

The Enterprise bridge was partially recreated for the Star Trek: The Next Generation episode "Relics" (1992). The original set had long been torn down, and producers initially planned to use the film-era set. Ultimately, recreations of the captain's chair, navigation console, and engineering console were rented from fans, and the rest filled in with archival footage and greenscreen technology. The bridge was again partially recreated, with other parts  added digitally, for the Deep Space Nine episode "Trials and Tribble-ations" (1996). Mike Okuda used a computer to recreate the graphics seen on the Enterprise sets, and others were drawn by artist Doug Drexler. Set designer Laura Richarz's biggest challenge was finding Burke chairs to populate the ship: she found just one, which the production team used to make molds to create more.

1970s redesigns for television and film
Shortly after the animated Star Trek went off the air, pre-production began on Star Trek: Planet of the Titans. Ken Adam and Ralph McQuarrie designed a new Enterprise with a triangular hull that later inspired the appearance of the eponymous ship in Star Trek: Discovery. Planet of the Titans was dropped in favor of a return to television with Star Trek: Phase II, for which Jefferies designed a new Enterprise. He began with the original design and identified components, such as the engines, that would have been upgraded. Some components, like the sensor dish, would move inside the ship to be more easily serviced. Abandoning Phase II in favor of producing Star Trek: The Motion Picture (1979) necessitated additional Enterprise redesigns because the film medium would resolve more detail than television, and one of the most difficult challenges facing the film producers was recreating the Enterprise for film. Roddenberry told Cinefantastique that the changes to the Enterprise would be explained within the story as the outcome of a major refit.

When Jefferies left the project, art director Richard Taylor wanted to start over with designing the Enterprise. However, Roddenberry convinced him to continue working with Jefferies' design. Taylor brought on Andrew Probert to work with him on refining the ship's details. Probert added items such as phaser banks, control thrusters, and hatches for saucer section landing gear; Taylor redesigned the edge of the saucer and elements of the warp nacelles. Art director Joe Jennings and conceptual illustrator Mike Minor added additional details. David Kimble created diagrams and deck plans for the updated Enterprise that were provided to model makers, toy companies, and other licensed product manufacturers.

Jim Dow was in charge of building the model. An arc-welded aluminum skeleton ensured parts of the ship would not sag, bend, or shake when moved. While the original Enterprise model was seen in only 17 poses, the new model had five articulation points and could be shot from any angle. Paul Olsen painted the  "Aztec" hull pattern to provide an additional level of detail and to suggest the presence of interlocking panels providing strength. The effect is made possible by small particles of mica in the paint, which alters its apparent color. However, the paint created light flare that made it hard to discern the edge of the ship against a dark background, and bluescreen light reflected by the pearlescent paint also complicated filming. Effects supervisor Douglas Trumbull relit the ship as if it were an ocean liner, "a grand lady of the seas at night", because there would be no external light source in deep space. A  model was used for long shots.

Production designer Harold Michelson was responsible for the ship's interior design. The Enterprise interiors were designed to be distinct from the film's Klingon ship, and certain support structure designs were used throughout the Enterprise sets to convey a shared motif. A new bridge had been designed and partially built for Phase II, and Michelson largely retained the design and its consoles. Chekov's console was rotated 90 degrees to break the monotony of stations facing the wall. Designer Lee Cole brought logic and function to the console designs, though Michelson wanted to remain focused on "drama, spectacle and beauty" over accuracy and logic. Rear projection films for bridge displays came initially from Stowmar Enterprises. When production exhausted the films faster than Stowmar could supply them, production designers manufactured their own from oscilloscopes, medical imagery, and an experimental computer lab.

Set designer Lewis Splittgerber described the engine room set as the most difficult to realize. Through forced perspective and small actors, the  set was depicted as a  engineering space. Corridors were initially a straight-wall design similar to the television series, and Michelson changed them to an angular design with light radiating upward. Director Robert Wise wanted the corridors to be narrower than on the television series, and mirrors gave the impression that they were longer than they actually were. Wise was also responsible for the ship's drab interior color scheme: the muted colors were meant to be comfortable across a five-year journey.

Sequel film adjustments, destruction, and return 
The Motion Pictures model was slightly refurbished for Star Trek II: The Wrath of Khan (1982), with its exterior shine dulled and extra detail added to the frame. Industrial Light & Magic (ILM) staff found the Enterprise difficult to work with: it took eight people to mount the model and a forklift to move it. Illustrator Mike Minor described the ship as a "sculpture" with an "aerodynamic shape," requiring careful filming so that its movements did not appear "silly". ILM developed techniques to depict damage to the Enterprise without actually harming the model.

The budget required the reuse of existing sets, but they presented challenges in realizing director Nicholas Meyer's desire for a "livelier" tone. The Enterprise was given a ship's bell, boatswain's call, and more blinking lights and signage to match the nautical atmosphere Meyer wanted to convey. Rear-projection systems for bridge displays were replaced with monitors looping taped material created by graphic designer Lee Cole at the Jet Propulsion Laboratory. The bridge set was "unbuttoned" so segments could be removed to better accommodate filming more dynamic action, though filming on the 360-degree set was still challenging. Further complicating the set was that it served three roles: the Enterprise bridge, the Reliant bridge, and the Starfleet bridge simulator. The production crew made several "plugs" to cover consoles and alcoves, and pyrotechnics could destroy the plugs during combat sequences without damaging the underlying set. The torpedo bay set is a redress of the Klingon bridge from The Motion Picture. Kirk's quarters were redressed with more personal items and a more naval appearance, and the same set depicted Spock's more monastic quarters. David Kimble's deck plans from The Motion Picture influenced how previously unseen interior arrangements like the torpedo bay were depicted in The Wrath of Khan.

Recognizing the plot of Star Trek III: The Search for Spock (1984) was otherwise predictable, producer Harve Bennett decided to have the Enterprise destroyed. Though he meant for the event to be kept secret, news leaked. Visual effects supervisor Ken Ralston hated the Enterprise model and reveled in its destruction. Rather than damage the large and expensive original model, several less expensive miniatures and modules were created and destroyed. One of the destroyed models had been created by Brick Price Movie Miniatures for Star Trek Phase II.

Ralston had hoped the Enterprises destruction in The Search for Spock would lead to a new Enterprise design for sequels, but the producers of Star Trek IV: The Voyage Home (1986) decided to have the crew assigned to a duplicate of their previous ship. It took ILM more than six weeks to restore and repaint the model to appear as the new USS Enterprise, NCC-1701-A. After visiting ILM, Majel Barrett described the model as "gorgeous," and she said some of its details – such as the windows into the arboretum – were not done justice by photographs.

Although its original pearlescent paint job had been covered and the ship redressed as the Enterprise-A, the eight-foot film franchise model was used as a referent for the CGI Enterprise created for the 2001 director's cut of The Motion Picture. The director's cut replaced several bridge computer voices with human voices to "warm up" the film. The bridge and several other Enterprise film sets were redressed for use in Star Trek: The Next Generation (1987–1994).

2009 film franchise reboot

The Enterprise was redesigned for the 2009 Star Trek film. Previsualization lead David Dozoretz credits the designers for overcoming the challenge of doing "a 2009 version of the '60s". Director J. J. Abrams wanted Enterprise to have a "hot rod" look while retaining the traditional shape, and he otherwise gave designers leeway to create the ship. The designers wanted the Enterprise to appear as carefully crafted as a luxury car. Concept artist Ryan Church retained much of the original Enterprise design and focused on the functionality behind the familiar components. His initial designs were modeled and refined by set designer Joseph Hiura. This design was then given to ILM for further refinement and developed into photo-realistic models by Alex Jaeger's team. ILM's Roger Guyett, recalling the original Enterprise as being "very static", added moving parts. ILM retained subtle geometric forms and patterns to allude to the original Enterprise, and the model's digital paint recreated the "Aztec" hull pattern from the first films. The large engine nacelles had a sleeker finish and shape compared to the original ship's otherwise simple nacelles. Sean Hargreaves' redesign of the successor NCC-1701-A "beef[ed] up" the vessel's support pylons, which are depicted as vulnerabilities in Star Trek Beyond (2016).

According to Abrams, recreating the original bridge would have been ridiculous and too small. His enthusiasm for a new iPhone influenced Church's redesign for the bridge. Sophisticated technology became a motif on the new set, with multiple displays and computer graphics. The main viewscreen from the television series was kept, and giving different characters their own computer displays suggested the idea of a team working together. Because the original series transporter room seemed flat to Abrams, he used swirling light and a moving camera to make the redesigned set and effects more dynamic. The budget prevented the creation of a huge, functional engineering room set, and producers instead filmed in portions of a Budweiser plant. Ben Burtt consulted with original series sound designed Douglas Grindstaff on sound design for the new Enterprise.

Return to television

Discovery 
The Enterprise appears briefly at the end of the Star Trek: Discovery's first-season finale (2018), and occasionally in the show's second season (2019). John Eaves, Scott Schneider, and William Budge redesigned the Enterprise for Discovery, which occurs about a decade before the original Star Trek. The designers had an unusually long time to work on the ship: April to October 2017, whereas they usually had only a few weeks to design a vessel. Other than a few small notes, they were given no explicit direction about the ship's appearance; Schneider called the redesign project the trio's "golden hour".

They briefly considered but quickly decided against an appearance significantly different from Jefferies' original design. Eaves created 10 relatively similar sketches that streamlined the original Enterprise to appear more consistent with the sleek Discovery aesthetic, and the team selected one to refine. They developed the vessel with the assumption that components like the warp nacelles and impulse engines would be replaced over time; the modules for the Enterprises appearance in Discovery are meant to appear more primitive than what is depicted in Star Trek. The designers tried to incorporate elements from other ships that precede and succeed the Enterprise, such as the 21st-century Phoenix in Star Trek: First Contact (1996), the 22nd-century Enterprise in Star Trek: Enterprise (2001–2005), and the USS Enterprise-B in Star Trek Generations (1994). They also included elements from the Enterprise refit for The Motion Picture. One distinct challenge was the hull: Jefferies' design featured a smooth hull, but the lack of features would appear too simple on modern high-definition displays. The designers added details, such as phaser banks and control thrusters, that "must have been there" on the original Enterprise but were not depicted on the Star Trek models. The ship's scale also fluctuated, which meant the designers had to adjust the window sizes and patterns.

Budge kept the designers in check with ensuring details and features added to the Enterprise were consistent with other Discovery ships. One such feature was whether the bridge would have a window: most Discovery ship bridges have a front-facing window, but the Enterprise had never been depicted like that. The solution was to depict the Enterprise bridge as having a large piece of transparent aluminum at its front that can become either transparent or opaque. Eaves sent the design team's model to the visual effects team, which made further design changes. Discovery producer Gretchen J. Berg said she hoped fans see the Enterprise's appearance in Discovery as a blending of old and new Star Trek. Another Discovery producer, Aaron Harberts, wasn't worried whether fans were satisfied with the ship's redesign: while many of the staff who developed the new appearance were Star Trek fans, Harberts stated fans rarely agree on anything.

The Enterprise bridge appears in the second season's finale. Production designer Tamara Deverell and her team wanted to honor the original bridge but needed to create the set using modern techniques and to meet modern audience expectations. The production's widescreen format, as opposed to the original series' 4:3 aspect ratio, required the set design to be more "stretched out" horizontally; designers referenced Star Trek film bridges – also recorded in widescreen – to assist with designing for the different ratio. Ultimately, the bridge was a fully constructed set, save for greenscreen for the main viewer. The set maintained the original's layout and included references and details from Star Trek, such as Sulu's and Spock's console scanners, red bridge railings, and turbolift handles. They also created new elements, such as a corridor running behind the bridge. According to Deverell, the hardest part of designing the bridge was choosing the color palette. The bridge chairs were nearly identical to those used in Star Trek, and the new captain's chair was heavily influenced by Captain Kirk's original. A fan-created replica of the original bridge – later opened as museum – sent the production team hundreds of buttons for the set's consoles.

Strange New Worlds 
The Enterprise is the main setting of Star Trek: Strange New Worlds (2022), which depicts the ship led by Captain Christopher Pike. Anson Mount, who plays Pike, said Strange New Worlds has a "big idea of the week" like the original Star Trek, and as such the Enterprise is "the star of the show". Rebecca Romjin, who plays first officer Una Chin-Riley, called the Enterprise "sexy, and groovy, and fun." Producer Akiva Goldsman said the designers for Strange New Worlds "tried to evoke the experience of watching [The Original Series], but with the grammar available to us today." He said the ship is meant to be aspirational and to pull audiences into an imagined future.

The Enterprise in Strange New Worlds differs slightly from its appearance in Discovery. The bridge set for Strange New Worlds was more compact than the one built for Discovery to bring it closer to the size of the original series set. The sets were designed to function like a practical starship, with moving components and pre-programmed monitor graphics that reacted to the actors. While the viewscreen was a visual effect in Discovery, it was physically built into the Strange New Worlds set. Sickbay was an entirely new design, meant to convey a large scale and capable of accommodating many camera movements. Designers relied on a massive augmented reality LED volume to depict the massive scale of main engineering. Due to COVID-19, some sets were not complete when filming began; Goldsman said they were "building the Enterprise around shooting on the Enterprise." Production designers also changed the color scheme, "warming" it from its Discovery palette. A specific shade of red is used as a secondary color throughout the ship, complementing warm and cold off-whites.

Depiction
Starfleet commissioned the Enterprise in 2245. Robert April is the Enterprises first captain, succeeded by Christopher Pike. Pike leads the Enterprise for about a decade, and he is the commanding officer in the original pilot, the second season of Star Trek: Discovery, and in Star Trek: Strange New Worlds. Throughout the first live action and animated Star Trek television series, Captain James T. Kirk commands the ship and its 430-person crew on an exploration mission from 2264 to 2269. Star Trek: The Motion Picture takes place in the 2270's as the Enterprise is completing an 18-month refit overseen by its new captain, Willard Decker. Decker describes the refit vessel as "an almost totally new Enterprise" when Admiral Kirk takes command to address a threat to Earth. Star Trek novels and other media depict a second five-year mission under Kirk's command between the events of the first and second films.

Captain Spock commands the Enterprise, serving as a training ship, at the beginning of Star Trek II: The Wrath of Khan in 2285. Kirk assumes command to investigate problems at space station Regula 1. The USS Reliant, hijacked by Khan Noonien Singh, seriously damages the Enterprise; Spock sacrifices his life to save the ship. Starfleet decides to decommission the Enterprise at the beginning of Star Trek III: The Search for Spock, and Kirk and his senior officers steal the ship as part of their plan to restore Spock's life. During their mission, a Klingon attack disables the ship. Kirk lures most of the Klingons onto the crippled Enterprise, which he and his officers set to self-destruct before abandoning ship. When Kirk and his officers return to Earth, Kirk is demoted to captain and given command of a new USS Enterprise, NCC-1701-A.

Reboot film series 

The 2009 reboot film Star Trek and its sequels occur in a different timeline than the original Star Trek. The Enterprise first appears while under construction in Riverside, Iowa, in 2255. Captain Christopher Pike commands Enterprise on its 2258 maiden voyage to respond to a Vulcan distress call. At the film's conclusion, James Kirk is promoted to captain and receives command of the Enterprise. The vessel is destroyed in Star Trek Beyond and a new Enterprise, NCC-1701-A, is commissioned under Kirk's command.

Critical reaction

Original appearance 
Like other Star Trek ships with the same name, the original Enterprise is "a character in its own right," and the ship "was just as important ... as Kirk, Spock, and McCoy". According to film critic Scott Jordan Harris, the Enterprise was the franchise's most important character, pointing out:Writing in the Journal of Popular Film & Television, National Air and Space Museum curator Margaret Weitekamp identifies two distinct celebrity Enterprises: the fictional starship Enterprise as a character or popular culture icon, and the actual physical objects (for example, the filming models) as an iconic design. According to Weitekamp, "The two Enterprises overlap, and are clearly related, but they do not map completely onto each other," and unpacking distinctions between them contributes to scholarly analysis of popular and material culture and of "this significant television artifact".

The Enterprise'''s design, which influenced future starships in the franchise, is iconic. The design came at the end of a trend for science-fiction spaceships to resemble rockets, and just as real spacecraft began to influence sci-fi designs. When it first appeared on television, the Enterprise was called an "elegant and weird looking behemoth". Design expert Jonathan Glancey described the "convincing and exciting" Enterprise as having the same aesthetic appeal as the Concorde jet, B-17 bomber, and Queen Elizabeth 2 ocean liner. The interiors are also exemplars of 1960s design. Popular Mechanics said the original Enterprise has the best design of the franchise's various ships named Enterprise. io9 also ranked the original design as the best version of the Enterprise, characterizing the original as superior to ten later versions of its namesake, and ranked the film refit as the franchise's second best.

 Film redesign and "death" 
Harris included the Enterprise as one of the 50 most significant objects to appear in film, alongside the ruby slippers in The Wizard of Oz, the Maschinenmensch in Metropolis, and the Batmobile in Batman Begins. Time called the ship's redesign for The Motion Picture "bold" and "handsome". Conversely, Harlan Ellison called the Enterprise a "jalopy" in The Motion Picture, and The Washington Post said the Enterprise looked "like a toy boat in a lava lamp" in The Wrath of Khan. Entertainment Weekly wrote that, after being depicted as a complicated vessel requiring detailed care in The Wrath of Khan, it seemed "a bit loony" for the Enterprise to be operable by just a handful of officers in The Search for Spock. Jill Sherwin suggested that the aging Enterprise in The Search for Spock served as a metaphor for the aging Star Trek franchise.

The ship's destruction has been described as "truly iconic" and "a good way to go", though David Gerrold wrote that it "casts a pall" over The Search for Spock that even Spock's resurrection does not displace. David C. Fein, who produced the director's cut of The Motion Picture, described the Enterprise as Kirk's lover, and said destroying the ship meant Kirk "killed the woman that he loves more than any existing being in the world." Popular Mechanics ranked the ship's destruction the 32nd greatest scene in science fiction.

 Spin-off television appearances The New York Times called it "a joy" to see the original Enterprise as redesigned for Discovery's second-season premiere. Engadget called the Enterprise in Strange New Worlds "gorgeous inside and out." Writing for Tor.com, Keith DeCandido praised Strange New Worlds' producers for balancing the Enterprise's original 1960s look with what audiences expect from modern productions. TrekCore said Strange New Worlds' set dressing and use show the Enterprise "as both a character unto herself and as a mirror reflecting the people who inhabit her."

 Impact 

 Within the franchise 
The original Enterprise and 1979 film designs have affected subsequent Star Trek productions. The USS Excelsior in Star Trek III is meant to make the Enterprise "look old and out of date". Model maker Bill George tried to imagine what the Enterprise would look like if it were designed by the Japanese, and he used that impression as the basis for his refinement of the Excelsior model. Andrew Probert returned to Star Trek to design a new USS Enterprise, NCC-1701-D, for Star Trek: The Next Generation (1987–1994), which takes place 100 years after the original Star Trek. The Enterprise-D retains the hallmarks of Matt Jefferies' design for the original Enterprise: a saucer section, engineering section, and a pair of engine nacelles. Probert did this in part to assuage skeptical fans who were concerned about the original Enterprise being "replaced". Much of Probert's design is based on a "what if?" painting he made after finalized the 1979 film Enterprise design. The USS Titan in Star Trek: Picard's third season draws inspiration from the film redesign, which producer Terry Matalas called "the best starship design ever made.

 Broader culture 
The starship Enterprise has had considerable cultural impact, and the original ship's model is "a living cultural object". Bjo Trimble said the original Star Trek received more fan letters about the Enterprise than any of the actors. According to film critic Scott Jordan Harris, although the contemporaneous Apollo program prompted intellectual awareness of the possibilities of space travel, it was the Enterprise of the 1960s that sparked space travel fantasies. A 1976 write-in campaign led to the first Space Shuttle being named Enterprise rather than Constitution. In 2009, Virgin Galactic named its first commercial spaceship  to honor the Star Trek vessel. The United States Navy evaluated the efficiency of the Enterprise bridge's style and layout, and the USS Independence's bridge and USS Zumwalt's Ship's Mission Center have been compared to the Enterprise bridge. An Enterprise bridge replica created for a Star Trek fan series was later opened as a public exhibit. The distinct beeps emitted by R2-D2 in Star Wars are "an offspring" of the melodic sounds created for the Enterprises bridge console. Vulcan, Alberta, created a  model starship inspired by the Enterprise.The Enterprise design has been licensed for use in variety of games, models, and toys. AMT's 1966 Enterprise model is one of the company's highest-selling kits. Ballantine Books released a set of Enterprise blueprints in April 1975, and by December 1976 they were in their seventh printing. The first run of a cutaway drawing of the Enterprise for The Motion Picture sold over one million prints. In 2010, Simon & Schuster's Gallery Books published a Haynes Manual for "owners" of the USS Enterprise. The United States Postal Service has released several USS Enterprise stamps. Pulitzer Prize–winning editorial cartoonist Mike Luckovich has used the Enterprise as the setting for two of his illustrations for The Atlanta Journal-Constitution.

 Production models and props 
Paramount Pictures donated the original series filming model to the Smithsonian Institution in 1974, disassembled across three crates and dirty. In shipping the model, Paramount estimated the value of the model at $5,000. Starting in 1976, it hung at an exhibit gallery entrance at the National Air and Space Museum before being moved to the gift shop, where it stayed for 14 years. In the first of its initial restorations, the model was altered to look more like the starship Enterprise and less like a studio filming model. The model underwent restorations in 1974, 1984, 1992, and 2016. For much of its time on display, fans have been surprised at the differences between the model and their expectations about how the "real" spacecraft should appear. A substantial, multi-year restoration culminated in 2016 with the unveiling of a new display in the Milestones of Flight Hall. This restoration highlighted the duality of the Enterprise as both a filming model and inspirational starship.

The original captain's chair prop sold at auction for $304,750. In 2006, Paul Allen bought the Enterprise model created for the original Star Trek'' films for $240,000, and it is on display at the Museum of Pop Culture. Another model of the film version is on display at aerospace company Blue Origin.

References

Citations

Sources

Further reading 

Enterprise - Hypersonic velocity test of the hull design by University of Queensland's X2 Super-Orbital Expansion Tube using holographic interferometry

External links 
 USS Enterprise model page at the National Air and Space Museum
 Andrew Probert's page with photos, drawings, and notes on the Phase II and Motion Picture designs and models

Fictional elements introduced in 1966
Enterprise
Star Trek: The Original Series
Star Trek: Phase II
Artifacts in the collection of the Smithsonian Institution

de:Enterprise (Raumschiff)#USS Enterprise (NCC-1701)